The Last of the Mohicans is a 1968 internationally co-produced Western film, co-directed by Jean Dréville, Pierre Gaspard-Huit and Sergiu Nicolaescu. It was the second episode of the European TV miniseries Leatherstocking Tales.

Cast
In alphabetical order
 Otto Ambros as Colonel Munro
 Alexandru David as Uncas
 Roland Ganemet as David Gamut
 Luminita Iacobescu as Cora Munro
 Hellmut Lange as Natty Bumppo
 Sybil Maas as Alice Munro
 Pierre Massimi as Chingachgook
 Adrian Mihai
 Ali Raffi as Magua

References

External links
 

1968 films
Romanian drama films
1960s Romanian-language films
1968 Western (genre) films
Films directed by Jean Dréville
Films directed by Pierre Gaspard-Huit
Films directed by Sergiu Nicolaescu
Films based on The Last of the Mohicans
1960s German television miniseries
1960s French television miniseries
German-language television shows
1969 German television series debuts
1969 German television series endings
1970 French television series debuts
1970 French television series endings
1960s Western (genre) television series
ZDF original programming